A Few Less Men is a 2017 Australian adventure comedy film directed by Mark Lamprell and written by Dean Craig. It is a sequel to A Few Best Men (2011).

Cast
Xavier Samuel as David Locking
Dacre Montgomery as Mike
Kris Marshall as Tom
Kevin Bishop as Graham
Ryan Corr as Henry
Saskia Hampele as Angie
Deborah Mailman as Sergeant Simpson
Sacha Horler as Ranger Ruth
Jeremy Sims as Pilot Pidgeon
Shane Jacobson as Mungus
Darren Gilshenan as Eric
Pip Edwards as Janet
Lynette Curran as Maureen

Production
Filming took place in Western Australia.

References

External links

A Few Less Men at Screen Australia

2017 films
Australian adventure comedy films
Australian buddy comedy films
Films directed by Mark Lamprell
Films shot in Western Australia
Australian sequel films
StudioCanal films
Screen Australia films
2010s English-language films
2010s Australian films